Ross Webster can refer to:
Ross Webster, character in Superman III
A. Ross Webster (1903–1988), Canadian politician